Chasmops is a trilobite in the order Phacopida that existed during the upper Ordovician in what is now Estonia. It was described by McCoy in 1849, and the type species is Chasmops odini, which was originally described under the genus Calymene by Eichwald in 1840. It also contains the species C. maxima.

References

External links
 Chasmops at the Paleobiology Database

Fossil taxa described in 1849
Ordovician trilobites of Europe
Fossils of Estonia
Paleozoic life of Ontario
Paleozoic life of the Northwest Territories
Pterygometopidae
Phacopida genera